Huang Longyun (born November 1951) is a politician of the People's Republic of China, the current chairman of the Guangdong People's Congress, and the former chairman of the Chinese People's Political Consultative Conference (CPPCC) Guangdong Committee. Huang is a native of Meixian District, Meizhou, Guangdong.

Beginning in 1995, Huang served in a number of positions in Zhuhai, Guangdong, including municipal CPC Committee deputy secretary, acting mayor, and mayor. In 2000, he was elevated to the Guangdong provincial Party Standing Committee. In 2002, he was concurrently named Party Committee Secretary of Foshan. In 2007, Huang became Vice-Governor of Guangdong Province. In 2010, he was selected as the CPPCC Guangdong Committee Chairman, and on 31 January 2013 was named to as People's Congress Chairman.

References 

1951 births
Living people
People from Meixian District
Political office-holders in Guangdong
People's Republic of China politicians from Guangdong
Chinese Communist Party politicians from Guangdong
Politicians from Meizhou